Vâlcănești is a commune in Prahova County, Muntenia, Romania. It is composed of three villages: Cârjari, Trestioara, and Vâlcănești.

The commune lies on the banks on the river Cosmina, in the foothills of the Sub Carpathians.

At the 2011 census, Vâlcănești had 3,502 residents; of those, 91.03% were ethnic Romanians and 6.25% were Roma.

References

Communes in Prahova County
Localities in Muntenia